Moktha is a village in Mingin Township, Kale District, in the Sagaing Region of western Burma. It is located close to the left bank of the Chindwin River.

References

External links
Maplandia World Gazetteer

Populated places in Kale District
Mingin Township